Ling Zifeng (Beijing, 10 March 1917 – 3 March 1999) was a Chinese film director.

Ling was born in Beijing of a family from Hejiang, Luzhou, in Sichuan.

Filmography
 Daughters of China (1949), winner of Freedom Award at Karlovy Vary International Film Festival
 Mother (1956), Prize at the Czechoslovak International Film Festival
 Rickshaw Boy (1982), Winner of Best Film (together with At Middle Age) at Golden Rooster Awards

References

1917 births
1999 deaths
Film directors from Beijing